Five Stars is the second album by Chinese hip-hop group Higher Brothers, released on 22 February 2019 through 88rising and 12Tone Music. The album was announced on 8 February 2019 and features American rappers ScHoolboy Q, Soulja Boy and JID among others. It was their first album to be recorded in a professional studio. The artists have stated that the album's title comes from the five stars on the Chinese flag as well as high quality "five star" rapping.

Track listing
Track list adapted from Tidal.

References

2019 albums
88rising albums
Higher Brothers albums
Albums produced by Ronny J